The Interstate Wildlife Violator Compact (IWVC) is a United States interstate compact (an agreement among participating states) to provide reciprocal sharing of information regarding sportsman fishing, hunting, and trapping violations and allows for recognition of suspension or revocation of hunting, fishing, and trapping licenses and permits in other member states resulting from violations concerning hunting, fishing and trapping laws in order to prevent poaching across state lines. 

Illegal activities in one state can thus affect a person’s hunting or fishing privileges in all member states. The IWVC obligates members to report wildlife violation convictions to Compact members, gives the members the capability to honor each other's suspensions, and provides the method to exchange violator data between member states. A conviction in one Compact member state may cause them to be barred from participating in hunting, fishing, and trapping in all member states, at the discretion of each state.

Introduction
If a person's license or permit privileges which come under the scope of the Compact are suspended or revoked in one member state, they are subject to suspension or revocation in all member states. In addition to license and permit suspensions and revocations which result from a conviction for the illegal pursuit, possession or taking of mammals, birds, fish, reptiles, amphibians, mollusks, shellfish and crustaceans, failing to appear in court or to otherwise answer a ticket or summons issued for such violations will also result in license or permit suspension. Compact member states also agree to recognize convictions for violations within the scope of the Compact which occur in all other member states and to apply them toward license and permit suspension and revocations in the state in which the person resides.

The Interstate Wildlife Violator Compact also establishes a process whereby wildlife law violations by a non-resident from a member state are handled as if the person were a resident, meaning they can be served a ticket rather than being arrested, booked, and bonded. This process is a convenience for hunters, fishermen, and trappers of member states, and increases efficiency of Game Wardens by allowing more time for enforcement duties rather than violator processing procedures.

Each member state honors all similar wildlife violation suspensions from other member states. This would include Failure to Appear in court violations. One of the benefits to sportsman who violate wildlife laws is if they are from a member state game warden can write them a simple citation instead of taking them to jail and having them post a cash bond. If a non-resident sportsman is issued a wildlife citation fails to comply with the citation or appear in court, the Wildlife Agency of that state will notify their home state of a Failure to Comply. The home state will then suspend that person's resident hunting or fishing license. Once the sportsman complies with the initial violation, their home state will be notified and their resident license will be reinstated. The threat of not being able to hunt, fish, or trap in most states will serve as a powerful deterrent to would be poachers.

For a state to become a part of the compact, the state first must pass a legislation to join then the state's wildlife agency will adopt regulations to implement the membership. Membership in the compact requires no additional funding or additional staffing, however, as of 2018, there is a $500 annual membership fee for each state. Entering the violators into the database take a small amount of time and is normally the responsibility of the state's existing wildlife agency personnel.

History
The concept of a wildlife violator compact was first advanced in the early 1980s by member states in the Western Association of Fish and Wildlife Agencies. Law enforcement administrators and Wildlife Commissioners from several states began discussing the idea of a compact based on the format of the existing Driver License Compact and Non-Resident Violator Compacts, both of these related to motor vehicle operator licensing and enforcement.

In 1985 draft compacts were developed independently in Colorado and Nevada. Subsequently, these drafts were merged and the Interstate Wildlife Violator Compact was created. During the 1989 Legislative session compact legislation was passed into law in Colorado, Nevada and Oregon. These three states formed the nucleus of the compact.

Member states
The 48 IWVC member states are: Alabama, Alaska, Arizona, Arkansas, California, Colorado, Connecticut, Delaware, Florida, Georgia, Idaho, Illinois, Indiana, Iowa, Kansas, Kentucky, Louisiana, Maine, Maryland, Michigan, Minnesota, Mississippi, Missouri, Montana, Nebraska (bill is currently on the Governor's desk), Nevada, New Hampshire, New Jersey, New Mexico, New York, North Dakota, North Carolina, Ohio, Oklahoma, Oregon, Pennsylvania, Rhode Island, South Carolina, South Dakota, Tennessee, Texas, Utah, Vermont, Virginia, Washington, West Virginia, Wisconsin, and Wyoming.

Every state which is a member has a page describing the compact. Here are some of them.
 Montana  (Montana indicates that Utah is a member)
 Ohio 
 Wisconsin

Non-member states
These two states are, as of July 2018, not members of the IWVC: Hawaii, and Massachusetts. 

State legislation is pending in Massachusetts to enter the Commonwealth into the IWVC and to update penalties for existing wildlife crimes, including elevating fines, jail time, and license suspensions. Entering the IWVC will prevent wildlife violators who have lost their hunting, trapping, or fishing privileges in member states from going to Massachusetts to circumvent their license revocations and preventing Massachusetts residents who have lost their licenses from going out of state to evade punishment. The legislation also creates heightened penalties for chronic poachers and those who kill animals for pure thrill, to give the Massachusetts Environmental Police an additional tool to target those who intentionally and repeatedly disregard the laws in place to protect wildlife.

How the Compact Works
The compact creates reciprocity among member states for purposes of hunting, fishing, and trapping license suspensions. In most instances, when a resident of a Compact state ("home state") commits a wildlife violation in another member state ("charging state"), the officer in the charging state can treat the non-resident violator as though he/she were a resident - issuing a citation and releasing him/her on personal recognizance. If the violator fails to comply with the citation, the charging state may request the violator's home state to suspend hunting privileges until the violator complies with the terms of the ticket. If the violator is convicted, he/she will be entered into the Compact database. The home state and all member states may treat the conviction as though it occurred in their own state for purposes of license suspension.

Benefits of the Compact
The Compact reduces poaching through reciprocal recognition of license suspensions which reduces interstate wildlife violator movement. Previous to the Compact, a poacher could lose their license and simply cross state lines with no penalty. They would have to lose their license in each state in order for penalties to take effect. With the Compact, poachers caught poaching in a participating state, he/she will be held accountable for his/her actions across any participating state. 

The Compact streamlines the process for dealing with non-resident violators, conserving valuable state resources and enhancing efficiency of services. There are fewer arrests because officers can cite-and-release non-residents, thereby reducing the burden on jail facilities and courts. In addition, since a non-resident offender is subject to license suspension in his/her state home state for failure to comply with a citation, he/she has the same incentive to comply as a resident - reducing failure-to-appear cases.

Process for Joining
There are a few steps required for a state to join the Compact:

1. The state must pass legislation to join (incorporating the Compact directly into the state's statutes or authorizing the state wildlife agency to join). 

2. The agency must adopt regulations to implement Compact membership. States communicate suspensions with each other using the Compact database, which stores revocation information. 

3. States must pay an annual fee of $500 for access to the database. Entering violators into the Compact and ratifying other states' suspensions requires a minor time commitment and this responsibility is usually carried out by existing agency personnel.

Conflicting with State Laws
The Compact provides general procedures to be followed by enforcement agencies and courts. A state can develop specific Compact procedures to comply with legal and administrative requirements of that state as long as the procedures comply with the intent of the Compact. The Compact does not affect the right of any participating state to apply any of its laws relating to license privileges to any person or circumstance. When the Compact conflicts with a state's laws, it remains in full force and effect for the at state without the conflicting provision.

References

United States interstate compacts
Wildlife law
Law enforcement databases in the United States